This is a list of Liberal Party (Philippines) members.

Gerardo Roxas Sr. (Senator; Liberal Party leader during the Marcos Sr. dictatorship) 
Macario Peralta Jr. (World War II Hero, Philippine Army General, Senator of the Philippines, Secretary of National Defense)
Fernando Lopez (3rd and 7th Vice President of the Philippines under Elpidio Quirino and Ferdinand Marcos Sr.  and Senator)
Cesar Climaco (Mayor of Zamboanga City, vocal critic and opponent of Martial Law)
Benigno Aquino Jr. (Senator of the Philippines)
Orly Mercado (Senator of the Philippines)
Eva Estrada-Kalaw (Senator of the Philippines)
Eddie Ilarde (Senator of the Philippines)
Ramon Mitra Jr. (16th Speaker of the Philippine House of Representatives)
Narciso Ramos (Philippine Secretary of Foreign Affairs; one of the co-founders)
Ramon Bagatsing (longest-serving Mayor of Manila, Plaza Miranda bombing survivor)
Martin B. Isidro (former Vice Mayor of Manila)
Emmanuel Pelaez (6th Vice President of the Philippines, Philippine Secretary of Foreign Affairs; Philippine Ambassador to the United States of America, Senator of the Philippines) 
Rashid Lucman (former Representative of Lanao del Sur, Exposed the Jabidah massacre and other Marcos abuses in Congress)
Ambrosio Padilla (former Senate President of the Philippines)
Quintin Paredes (former Senate President of the Philippines)
Jovito Salonga (former Senate President of the Philippines, survived the Plaza Miranda bombing)
Manuel Roxas II (former Interior and Local Government Secretary and Transportation Secretary)
Sergio Osmeña Jr. (Senator of the Philippines, former Mayor of Cebu City and 1969 presidential candidate)
Sergio Osmeña III (Senator of the Philippines)
John Henry Osmeña (Senator of the Philippines)
Genaro Magsaysay (Senator of the Philippines and 1969 vice presidential candidate)
Carlos P. Romulo (Philippine Ambassador to the United States and Secretary of Foreign Affairs)
Enrique Magalona (Senator of the Philippines)
José Avelino (Senator of the Philippines and 1949 presidential candidate under his own wing)
Vicente Francisco (Senator of the Philippines and 1949 vice presidential candidate under Avelino wing)
Lorenzo Tañada (former Minority leader of the Senate of the Philippines)
Wigberto Tañada (former Minority leader of the Senate of the Philippines)
Antonio Villegas (former Mayor of Manila)
Feliciano Belmonte Jr. (former Speaker of the Philippine House of Representatives)
Joy Belmonte (Mayor of Quezon City, was an LP member during her term as Vice Mayor)
Joel Villanueva (Senator of the Philippines, was an LP member during his term as congressman and first term as senator)
Danilo Lacuna (former Vice Mayor of Manila, was an LP member during his term as Vice Mayor under Villegas)
Ralph Recto (Senator of the Philippines)
Vilma Santos-Recto (former Governor & Representative of  the 6th district of Batangas)
Chel Diokno (2019 senatorial candidate under the party before moving to KANP and run again for senator in 2022, lawyer)
Teofisto Guingona Jr. (11th Vice President of the Philippines and former Senator)
Teofisto Guingona III (Senator of the Philippines)
Rene Saguisag (Senator of the Philippines)
Ernesto Herrera (Senator of the Philippines)
Salipada Pendatun (Senator of the Philippines)
Santanina Rasul (Senator of the Philippines)
Rogelio de la Rosa (Senator of the Philippines)
Jesse Robredo (former Mayor of Naga City & former Interior and Local Government Secretary)
Leni Robredo (14th Vice President of the Philippines, former Representative of Camarines Sur, Wife of former DILG Secretary Jesse Robredo & Party Chairman in Naga City)
Camilo Osías (former Senate President of the Philippines)
Herbert Bautista (former Mayor of Quezon City)
Alfredo Lim (former Senator & Mayor of Manila)
Rodolfo Biazon (former Senator of the Philippines and Representative of Muntinlupa's lone district)
Lito Atienza (former Mayor of Manila)
Rafael Nantes (former Governor of Quezon Province & Former Treasurer of the Liberal Party)
Justiniano Montano (Senator of the Philippines)
Tomas Cabili (Senator of the Philippines)
Esteban R. Abada (Senator of the Philippines)
 Teodoro de Vera (Senator of the which replaced by the ruling of Senate Electoral Tribunal in favor of Claro M. Recto)
Neptali Gonzales (Senator of the Philippines and former Representative of Rizal's 1st district and Vice Governor of Rizal)
Estanislao Fernandez (Senator of the Philippines)
Evelyn Fuentebella (Mayor of Sagñay, Camarines Sur)
Cornelio Villareal (former Speaker of the House of Representatives, and Former Representative of the 2nd District of Capiz)
Francisco Soc Rodrigo (Senator of the Philippines)
Maria Kalaw Katigbak (Senator of the Philippines)
Gaudencio Antonino (Senator of the Philippines)
Jaime Fresnedi (Mayor of Muntinlupa)
Sergio H. Loyola (Representative of the 3rd District of Manila)
Romulo Peña Jr. (former Mayor and Representative of the 1st District of Makati)
Mel Lopez (former Mayor of Manila and Plaza Miranda bombing survivor, was a LP member during the final mayoralty term of Villegas as Vice Mayor and congressman at Manila's 1st District)
Chavit Singson (Member of the Vigan City Council, during his younger years)
Vicente Madrigal (Senator of the Philippines)
Jose Yulo (1953 vice presidential candidate and 1957 presidential candidate, former Senator and Chief Justice of the Philippines)
Antonio Quirino (1957 presidential candidate under his own wing, judge)
Melecio Arranz (former Senate President pro tempore of the Philippines)
Mariano Jesús Cuenco (Senator of the Philippines)
Ramon Torres (Senator of the Philippines
Olegario Clarin (Senator of the Philippines)
Prospero Sanidad (Senator of the Philippines)
Vicente dela Cruz (Senator of the Philippines)
Servillano dela Cruz (Senator of the Philippines)
Pedro Magsalin (Senator of the Philippines)
Geronima Pecson (Senator of the Philippines)
Emiliano Tria Tirona (Senator of the Philippines)
Pablo Ángeles David (Senator of the Philippines and former Governor of Pampanga)
Carlos Tan (short-term Senator of the Philippines, which replaced by the ruling of Senate Electoral Tribunal in favor of Eulogio Rodriguez)
Tecla San Andres Ziga (Senator of the Philippines and Representative of Albay's 1st district)
Juan Liwag (Senator of the Philippines)
Vicente A. Mayo (former Governor of Batangas)
Eugenio Pérez (former Speaker of the House of Representatives of the Philippines)
Valeriano E. Fugoso Sr. (former Mayor of Manila)	
Manuel dela Fuente (former Mayor of Manila)
Felecisimo T. San Luis  (former Governor of Laguna)
Dr. Jose Cariño  (former Mayor of Baguio)
Luis P. Torres  (former Mayor of Baguio)
Gil R. Mallare  (former Mayor of Baguio)
Benito H. Lopez  (former Mayor of Baguio)
Norberto F. de Guzman  (former Mayor of Baguio)
Carmelo L. Porras  (former Mayor of Davao City)
Nicolas Escario  (former Mayor of Cebu City)

References

 Liberal Party (Philippines) politicians
Liberal Party